The Cutler and Porter Block is a historic commercial building at 109 Lyman Street in Springfield, Massachusetts.  Built in 1894 and altered in 1923, it is an architecturally distinctive example of Panel Brick architecture, with important associations to several late 19th and early 20th-century local businesses.  The building was listed on the National Register of Historic Places in 1983.

Description and history
The Cutler and Porter Block is located on the north side of downtown Springfield, on the south side of Lyman Street opposite the Amtrak railyard.  It is a brick structure, four stories in height, with an elaborate cornice and parapet on the front, and a slightly less elaborate one on the exposed west side.  Top-floor windows are set in round-arch openings in the Romanesque style, while the first two floors are faced in stone, with ground-floor window bays filled with glass blocks.

The four story brick building was constructed in 1894 for the firm of Cutler and Porter Inc, a wholesaler of shoes, boots, and rubber goods, founded in 1880.  It was designed by Frederick S. Newman and made to be visually sympathetic to the adjacent Produce Exchange Building.  Cutler and Porter occupied the building until 1907.  In the 1920s the firm W.F. Young, Inc., founded in Meriden, Connecticut, occupied half of the building, eventually taking it over entirely.  Young remodeled the premises to accommodate its business, the production of horse liniments, and made changes to the facade, integrating its logo into the brickwork.

See also
National Register of Historic Places listings in Springfield, Massachusetts
National Register of Historic Places listings in Hampden County, Massachusetts

References

External links
 Cutler and Porter Block MACRIS Listing

Commercial blocks on the National Register of Historic Places in Massachusetts
Buildings and structures in Springfield, Massachusetts
National Register of Historic Places in Springfield, Massachusetts